The 1892 New Brunswick general election was held in October 1892, to elect 41 members to the 28th New Brunswick Legislative Assembly, the governing house of the province of New Brunswick, Canada. The election was held before the adoption of party labels.

There were a number of issues that led to dissatisfaction with the government among certain groups of voters in the province:
 in Bathurst, the Protestant minority felt that they were being overly taxed to support the operation of separate schools
 temperance societies did not support the government because it was opposed to prohibition
 some farmers were dissatisfied with the government's agricultural policy
However, the opposition was not able to organize an effective campaign to consolidate the support of factions opposed to the government.

The opposition had their best results in York County, where all the government candidates were defeated, and St. John County. A.G. Blair, the government leader, was defeated in York and was forced to run in a by-election held in Queen's.

Of forty-one MLAs, twenty-five supported the government, twelve formed the opposition, and the other four were neutral.

The province's Legislative Council had been abolished by legislation passed in 1891; that legislation now came into effect.

References 
 History of New Brunswick Provincial Election Campaigns and Platforms 1866-1974, CA Woodward (1976) 

1892 elections in Canada
Elections in New Brunswick
1892 in New Brunswick
October 1892 events